Guillaume Rouet (born 13 August 1988) is a rugby union player. He plays at scrum-half for Bayonne in the Top 14. Born in France, he plays internationally for Spain.

His brother  is also a rugby player and a Spanish international.

References

External links
Ligue Nationale De Rugby Profile
European Professional Club Rugby Profile
Bayonne Profile

1988 births
Living people
French rugby union players
Spanish rugby union players
Sportspeople from Bayonne
Rugby union scrum-halves
Aviron Bayonnais players
Spain international rugby union players
French people of Spanish descent